Kenneth John Ortega (born April 18, 1950) is an American filmmaker, touring manager, and choreographer.  He is known for directing the films Newsies, Hocus Pocus, The Cheetah Girls 2, High School Musical, Michael Jackson's This Is It, Descendants, and Julie and the Phantoms. He also choreographed the films St. Elmo's Fire, Pretty in Pink, Ferris Bueller's Day Off, and Dirty Dancing; and directed multiple concert tours for Cher, Gloria Estefan, Miley Cyrus, and Michael Jackson. For his work, Ortega was honored with both a star on the Hollywood Walk of Fame and a Disney Legend Award in 2019.

Early life
Ortega was born in Palo Alto, California, the son of Madeline, a waitress, and Octavio "Tibby" Ortega, a factory worker. He also has a sister, Debra Ortega. Both of his parents were also born in Palo Alto, though his paternal grandparents were Spanish immigrants. He attended Sequoia High School in Redwood City, California, where he was a cheerleader and in the drama group.

Career

Ortega began his career as an actor, appearing in a touring production of Oliver! and Hair before venturing into choreography and directing. Ortega was offered the leading role in a production of Jesus Christ Superstar, but turned the offer down to become a choreographer for the San Francisco-based band The Tubes after being spotted on the dance floor in a club by members of the band. Ortega toured with the band for ten years, before being contracted by Cher to choreograph a TV special and tour and by KISS on their Dynasty Tour.

In 1980, Ortega was hired as one of the choreographers on the film Xanadu, working with Gene Kelly who mentored him into choreographing for film. During this time period, Ortega also served as choreographer for several of John Hughes's films, including Pretty in Pink and Ferris Bueller's Day Off, as well as the 1987 film Dirty Dancing. 

Ortega would also choreograph several music videos, including "Material Girl" by Madonna, "She's a Beauty" by The Tubes, "Rock Me Tonite" by Billy Squier, Physical by Olivia Newton-John and "Mr. Roboto" by Styx.

He made his directorial debut in 1992 with the Disney musical Newsies, which was followed up by Hocus Pocus in 1993. Both films underperformed at the box-office but have since gone on to attract considerable cult followings. Ortega also served as choreographer for To Wong Foo, Thanks for Everything! Julie Newmar in 1995.

Alongside Michael Jackson, he created and designed Jackson's Dangerous World Tour (1992–1993), HIStory World Tour (1996–1997) and Michael Jackson & Friends (1999). He has also choreographed events ranging from Super Bowl XXX, the 72nd Academy Awards, the 1996 Summer Olympics (Atlanta) and the 2002 Winter Olympics (Salt Lake City).

In 2006, Ortega directed and choreographed two Disney Channel Original Movies, High School Musical and The Cheetah Girls 2. Ortega would return as director and choreographer for High School Musical 2 in 2007 and High School Musical 3: Senior Year in 2008.

In May 2009, Ortega began work directing and choreographing the scheduled 50-date Michael Jackson This Is It concert residency at The O2 Arena, billed as Jackson's final concerts in London. The engagement was subsequently cancelled due to Jackson's sudden death in June 2009. Ortega would serve as the director of the Michael Jackson Public Memorial at the Staples Center in Los Angeles, which was broadcast live on several networks on July 7, 2009, reaching a television audience of 31 million in America and more than one billion worldwide. 

At the end of the service, he introduced a rendition of Jackson's 1985 charity single "We Are the World" created for the This Is It concerts, featuring Jackson's backing singers on lead vocals with his dancers performing around them. Ortega directed the concert film Michael Jackson's This Is It, which was put together from rehearsal footage recorded at the Los Angeles Forum and the Staples Center.  The film was released on October 28 of the same year.

He was set to direct the 2011 Footloose remake, but dropped out in October 2009 due to differences with Paramount over the budget and tone of the film. 

Ortega was also hired to direct a film adaptation of the Broadway musical In the Heights for Universal, but the studio dropped the project in 2011 due to budgetary and casting issues. On August 9, 2011, it was announced that Ortega would direct a remake of Dirty Dancing, a project that was later postponed. The 2017 TV remake was filmed without Ortega's involvement.

On May 12, 2014, Ortega guest-judged on the 18th season of Dancing with the Stars during the semifinals.

In 2015, Ortega directed and choreographed Descendants for the Disney Channel, a film based on the children of legendary Disney Villains. He would return in the same capacity for its two sequels, Descendants 2 in 2017 and Descendants 3 in 2019.

In 2019, Ortega was honored with a star on the Hollywood Walk of Fame and was named a Disney Legend at the 2019 D23 Expo.

That fall, he directed and served as executive producer of the Netflix Original series  Julie and the Phantoms, which premiered on Netflix on September 10, 2020.

Personal life
Ortega is gay, and in a 2014 interview with anti-bullying organization Bystander Revolution, he said that "as a gay man having grown up in the 50s and 60s, I have to say, I'm very proud of the industry that I work in," referring to the acceptance of people with different sexual orientations in show business.

During the trial People v. Murray regarding the death of Michael Jackson, Ortega was the trial's first witness.

In 2020, Ortega recalled being falsely arrested at the age of 21 after a chief of police planted narcotics in his hotel room, allegedly upset by his performance in a touring production of Hair. The charges were dropped after investigations were made, and Ortega recalled the arrest report identifying him as George Berger, the name of the character he played in the show.

Filmography and concerts

Film

Television

Concerts

Awards and nominations

References

External links 
 
 
 Kenny Orgeta at MVDbase.com

1950 births
Living people
20th-century American male actors
American choreographers
American gay actors
American male film actors
American male musical theatre actors
American music video directors
American people of Spanish descent
American television directors
Directors Guild of America Award winners
Film directors from California
Helpmann Award winners
Hispanic and Latino American male actors
LGBT people from California
Male actors from Palo Alto, California
Primetime Emmy Award winners
American LGBT writers
LGBT film directors